Fritz Mauruschat (1901–1974) was a German football player and manager.

In 1961, Mauruschat was head coach of West Berlin XI for their away tie against Barcelona in the Inter-Cities Fairs Cup. He was appointed as a replacement for Jupp Schneider, who has unable to travel with the team due to illness.

References

External links
 Fritz Mauruschat – Eintracht Frankfurt archives 
 

1901 births
1974 deaths
Footballers from Berlin
German footballers
VfL Germania 1894 players
Eintracht Frankfurt players
SV Eintracht Trier 05 players
German football managers
Tennis Borussia Berlin managers
Association football defenders
SV Waldhof Mannheim managers